Dark Angel: The Ascent is a 1994 Romanian / American romantic supernatural horror film directed by Linda Hassani. It was released direct-to-video by Full Moon Entertainment.

Plot 
Veronica (Angela Featherstone) is a young demoness with a rebellious attitude who dreams of living among human beings on Earth. She is constantly talking out of turn and questioning the ways of the demon resulting in punishment after punishment. Fed up with this, her father, Hellikan (Nicholas Worth), tries to kill her but her mother, Theresa (Charlotte Stewart), stops Hellikan and Veronica escapes with her Hellhound, Hellraiser.  Her friend, Mary, shows her a secret opening to the Earth above; she passes through the opening and arrives through the sewers. As she steps onto Earth her demon form sheds and she becomes human. As a result, she is naked. As Veronica makes an effort to covers herself up, she is hit by a car.

Dr. Max Barris, a doctor at the nearby hospital, tends to her wounds and soon finds himself getting attached to her.  He invites her to stay with him.

She starts going out at night and witnesses a pair of street muggers attack a woman with clear intent to rape her. Veronica intervenes by killing them. When Max finds out, he questions Veronica where she reveals to him what she really is. Max dismisses this and accepts her for what she is.

Cast 
 Angela Featherstone - Veronica
 Daniel Markel - Dr. Max Barris
 Nicholas Worth - Father/Hellikin
 Charlotte Stewart - Mother/Theresa
 Milton James - Mayor Wharton
 Mike Genovese - Detective Harper
 Michael C. Mahon - Detective Greenburg
 Heros - Hellraiser
 Constantin Drăgănescu - Man in Hell
 Cristina Stoica - Mary
 Valentin Teodosiu - Hell's Professor
 Marius Stanescu - Fake Prophet
 Constantin Cotimanis - Fake Prophet

References

External links 

  
 

1994 horror films
1994 films
1994 direct-to-video films
American supernatural horror films
Romanian supernatural horror films
Demons in film
American vigilante films
Romanian horror films
American exploitation films
English-language Romanian films
American splatter films
1990s English-language films
1990s American films